John White Alexander (7 October 1856 – 31 May 1915) was an American portrait, figure, and decorative painter and illustrator.

Early life
Alexander was born in Allegheny, Pennsylvania, now a part of Pittsburgh, Pennsylvania. Orphaned in infancy, he was reared by his grandparents and, at the age of 12, became a telegraph boy in Pittsburgh. Edward J. Allen became an early supporter and patron of John W. Alexander, adopting the orphaned Alexander while he worked at the Pacific and Atlantic Telegraph Co. as a young man. Allen brought Alexander to the Allen home at "Edgehill" where Alexander painted various members of the Allen family, including Colonel Allen. His talent at drawing attracted the attention of one of his employers, who assisted him to develop them.

Training
He moved to New York City at the age of 18 and worked in an office at Harper's Weekly, where he was an illustrator and political cartoonist at the same time that Abbey, Pennell, Pyle, and other celebrated illustrators labored there. After an apprenticeship of three years, he traveled to Munich for his first formal training. Owing to the lack of funds, he removed to the village of Polling, Bavaria, and worked with Frank Duveneck. They traveled to Venice, where he profited by the advice of Whistler, and then he continued his studies in Florence, Italy; the Netherlands; and Paris.

In 1881, he returned to New York City and speedily achieved great success in portraiture, numbering among his sitters Oliver Wendell Holmes, John Burroughs, Henry G. Marquand, R.A.L. Stevenson, and president McCosh of Princeton University.

Awards and honors
His first exhibition in the Paris Salon of 1893 was a brilliant success and was followed by his immediate election to the Société Nationale des Beaux Arts. Many additional honors were bestowed on him. In 1889 he painted for Mrs. Jeremiah Milbank a well-received portrait of Walt Whitman and one of her husband, Jeremiah Milbank. In 1901, he was named Chevalier of the Legion of Honor, and in 1902, he became a member of the National Academy of Design, where he served as president from 1909 to 1915. He was a member of the American Academy of Arts and Letters, and president of the National Society of Mural Painters. Among the gold medals received by him were those of the Paris Exposition (1900) and the World's Fair in St. Louis, Missouri (1904).
He served as president of the National Society of Mural Painters from 1914 to 1915.

Personal life

Alexander was married to Elizabeth Alexander Alexander, to whom he was introduced in part because of their shared last name. Elizabeth was the daughter of James Waddell Alexander, president of the Equitable Life Assurance Society at the time of the Hyde Ball scandal. The Alexanders had one child, the mathematician James Waddell Alexander II.

Alexander died in New York on 31 May 1915.

Works
Many of his paintings are in museums and public places in the United States and in Europe, including the Metropolitan Museum of Art, the Brooklyn Art Museum, the Los Angeles County Museum of Art, the Museum of Fine Arts, Boston, the Butler Institute, and the Library of Congress in Washington D.C.  In addition, in the entrance hall to the Art Museum of the Carnegie Institute in Pittsburgh, Pennsylvania, a series of Alexander's murals titled "Apotheosis of Pittsburgh" (1905–1907) covers the walls of the three-story atrium area.

Alexander's artist's proof of his portrait of Whitman, signed by the artist in April 1911, is in the Walt Whitman Collection at the University of Pennsylvania.

Gallery

References

External links

John White Alexander at American Art Gallery
A Finding Aid to the John White Alexander papers, 1775–1968, bulk 1870–1915 in the Archives of American Art, Smithsonian Institution 
John White Alexander at Artcyclopedia
John White Alexander and the Construction of National Identity: Cosmopolitan American Art, 1880–1915 by Sarah J. Moore
Hervey Allen Papers

1856 births
1915 deaths
American illustrators
American muralists
19th-century American painters
American male painters
20th-century American painters
Artists from Pittsburgh
Chevaliers of the Légion d'honneur
Members of the American Academy of Arts and Letters
American expatriates in Germany
American expatriates in Italy
American expatriates in France
American expatriates in the Netherlands
19th-century American male artists
20th-century American male artists